Shazand (also Romanized as Shāzand and Shah Zand; also known as Azadshahr, also Romanized as Āzādshahr) is a city and capital of Shazand County, Markazi Province, Iran.  At the 2016 census, its population was 21,181.

References 

 History of Shazand
 Geological exploration in area of Shazand

Populated places in Shazand County
Cities in Markazi Province